Marek Kuczma (10 October 1935 in Katowice – 13 June 1991 in Katowice) was a Polish mathematician working mostly in the area of functional equations. He wrote several influential monographs in this field.

Bibliography

References
 Roman Ger, Marek Kuczma, 1935 – 1991, Aequationes Mathematicae 44 (1992), ss. 1-10,

External links
 

1935 births
1991 deaths
20th-century Polish mathematicians
People from Katowice